A university is an institution of higher education.

University may also refer to:

Places
 University, Minneapolis, a community in Minneapolis, Minnesota, U.S.
 University (neighborhood), Minneapolis, a neighborhood within the community
 University (constituency), Central and Western District Council, Hong Kong

Entertainment
 University (album), a 1995 album by Throwing Muses
 "University" (The Sopranos)
 The Sims 2: University, First Expansion Pack of The Sims 2
 University (film), a 2002 Tamil film

See also
University Avenue (disambiguation)
University City (disambiguation)
University College (disambiguation)
University Peak (disambiguation)
University Square (disambiguation)
University Station (disambiguation)
University Street (disambiguation)
College (disambiguation)